A consort song was a characteristic English song form of the late 16th and early 17th centuries, for solo voice or voices accompanied by a group of instruments, most commonly viols.  Although usually in five parts, some early examples of four-part songs exist. It is considered to be the chief representative of a native musical tradition which resisted the onslaught of the italianate madrigal and the English lute ayre, and survived those forms' brilliant but short-lived ascendancy .

In contemporary usage, the term was confined to a number of songs for four voices accompanied by the standard mixed consort of six instruments, found in Teares or Lamentacions of a Sorrowfull Soule: Composed with Musicall Ayres and Songs, both for Voyces and Divers Instruments by William Leighton, published in 1614, but was first used in the modern sense by Thurston Dart .

William Byrd is recognized as the composer whose adoption and development of the consort song established its musical importance. He regarded it as a standard means to set vernacular poetry .

References

Further reading
 Brett, Philip. 1961–62. "The English Consort Song, 1570–1625". Proceedings of the Royal Musical Association 88:73–88.
Kerman, Joseph. 1962. The Elizabethan Madrigal: A Comparative Study. [New York]: American Musicological Society.

16th-century music genres
17th-century music genres
Song forms